Lieutenant Colonel Sidney Godolphin (1652–1732) was an English soldier, politician and Member of Parliament for various seats between 1685 and 1732, becoming Father of the House in 1730. He also reached the rank of Lieutenant Colonel and was Governor of Scilly from 1700 until his death in September 1732.

Personal details

Baptised on 12 January 1652 in London, Sidney Godolphin was the only surviving son of John Godolphin (1617–1678), an English jurist and author, and his second wife Mary Tregose, daughter of William Tregose of St Ives, Cornwall. His father married four times and had a total of eleven children, of whom only Sidney and two others survived childhood; his older half-brother Francis (1642-after 1679) and a half-sister Rebecca (1676-after 1699).  

A member of one of the wealthiest families in Cornwall, John Godolphin supported Parliament in the Wars of the Three Kingdoms, unlike his Royalist cousins Sidney, killed in 1643, and Francis. During the Commonwealth, he served as Judge of the High Court of Admiralty, then as King's Advocate after the 1660 Stuart Restoration.   

In 1673, Godolphin married Susanna Tanat (1650-1723), youngest daughter and co-heiress of Rees Tanat of Llanyblodwel in Shropshire. They had one son, Tanat (1675-1696), who died of fever while serving in Flanders, and four daughters, Mary (1676-1766), Margaret (1678-1743), Ellen (1680-1754) and Penelope (1682-after 1732).

Career

Godolphin attended legal school at the Inner Temple in 1668 but little is known of his activities until June 1685, when he was commissioned captain in the Earl of Bath's regiment, raised by James II following the Monmouth Rebellion. In the 1685 English general election, he was returned as MP for the family-controlled seat of Helston, although Parliament was suspended by James in November.     

In August 1688, his regiment was sent to garrison Plymouth, a key strategic port in the West Country; the Earl of Bath, who was Governor of the town, defected to William of Orange after his landing at Torbay during the November 1688 Glorious Revolution. In early 1689, Godolphin and a detachment of the regiment secured Guernsey, where he served as Lieutenant Governor for the next year. In March 1690 he was elected MP for Penryn and in April appointed Lieutenant-Governor of the Isles of Scilly, which had been owned by his family since the late 16th century.

In addition to his duties as Lieutenant-Governor, he spent most of the next three years in Parliament where he normally voted in favour of the government. In October 1693, Bevil Granville, then commanding the Earl of Bath's regiment in Flanders, became Colonel and returned to London; in February 1694, Godolphin was promoted Lieutenant Colonel and went out to take his place. He served there for the next two years; during the operations around Namur in June 1695, he was captured by a French cavalry patrol.

How long he was held prisoner is unclear but he missed the November 1695 election and resigned his commission in 1696, shortly before the 1697 Treaty of Ryswick. In August 1698, he was elected once again for Helston, a seat he retained without interruption until 1713. He replaced his cousin the Earl of Godolphin as Governor of Scilly in April 1700 and was commissioned as a major in the Queen's regiment, part of the military expansion caused by the imminent outbreak of the War of the Spanish Succession.        

However, he resigned his commission in early 1702 due to poor health and in June was appointed Auditor of the Exchequer for Wales, where his wife owned property. He was generally viewed as a member of the Whig faction and in 1709 voted for the impeachment of High church minister and Tory favourite Henry Sacheverell. Although he held his seat in the 1710 Tory landslide that followed, he lost it when they made further gains in September 1713.      

Following the succession of George I in August 1714, the Tories were swept from office, ushering a period of Whig dominance which lasted nearly 50 years. Godolphin regained his seat at Helston in March 1715, then switched to St Mawes in 1722, followed by St Germans in 1727. His long service meant he became Father of the House although he left little impact on the Parliamentary records.   

In 1723, he bought a house in Thames Ditton, where he died on 22 September 1732 and buried in the Church of St Nicholas. It contains an elaborate monument installed by his daughter Ellen who inherited the bulk of his property.

Notes

References

Sources

Further reading

1652 births
1732 deaths
Military personnel from London
Burials in Surrey
People from Cornwall
Members of the Inner Temple
Royal Lincolnshire Regiment officers
Queen's Royal Regiment officers
Members of the pre-1707 English Parliament for constituencies in Cornwall
English MPs 1695–1698
English MPs 1698–1700
English MPs 1701
English MPs 1701–1702
English MPs 1702–1705
English MPs 1705–1707
Members of the Parliament of Great Britain for constituencies in Cornwall
British MPs 1707–1708
British MPs 1708–1710
British MPs 1710–1713
British MPs 1715–1722
British MPs 1722–1727
British MPs 1727–1734
Sidney
Governors of the Isles of Scilly